As Mãos is the eighth album by the Portuguese music composer António Pinho Vargas. It was released in 1998.

Track listing

References

António Pinho Vargas albums
1998 albums